This article lists the census-designated places (CDPs) in the state of Maryland, their population, and the county(ies) they reside in. The only county which doesn't contain a CDP is Cecil County.

Census-designated places

See also
 Maryland
 List of municipalities in Maryland

References

*
Maryland
Census

Census-designated places in Maryland
Maryland geography-related lists